Carmel Anne Maher (born 5 April 1954) is an Australian politician. She was a member of the Australian Capital Territory Legislative Assembly from 1989 to 1991, serving one term. She represented the No Self-Government Party and later the Independents Group.

References

Members of the Australian Capital Territory Legislative Assembly
1954 births
Living people
No Self-Government Party members of the Australian Capital Territory Legislative Assembly
Independents Group members of the Australian Capital Territory Legislative Assembly
Women members of the Australian Capital Territory Legislative Assembly